Matúš Vojtko (born 5 October 2000) is a Slovak professional footballer who currently plays for HNK Gorica, on loan from Fortuna Liga club Slovan Bratislava as a defender.

Club career

MFK Zemplín Michalovce
Vojtko made his Fortuna Liga debut for Zemplín Michalovce against Slovan Bratislava on 5 August 2018. He played for the entirety of the match. Zemplínčania lost the game 1:2.

Honours
Slovan Bratislava
Fortuna Liga: 2021–22

References

External links
 Futbal SFZ profile
 
 Futbalnet profile

2000 births
Living people
People from Michalovce
Sportspeople from the Košice Region
Slovak footballers
Slovakia youth international footballers
Slovakia under-21 international footballers
Association football defenders
MFK Zemplín Michalovce players
ŠK Slovan Bratislava players
Slovak Super Liga players
HNK Gorica players
Croatian Football League players
Expatriate footballers in Croatia
Slovak expatriate sportspeople in Croatia